Puissance is an Irish Sport Horse active as a show horse. Foaled in 1988, Puissance stands . He was named the IHB Champion Stallion for the 1996–1997 season.

References

Irish Sport Horses